Three auxiliary routes of Arkansas Highway 25 currently exist. Two are spur routes, with one serving as a business route.

Heber Springs business route

Arkansas Highway 25 Business is a business route in Heber Springs.

The route passes through downtown Heber Springs, specifically passing the T.E. Olmstead & Son Funeral Home, Hugh L. King House, the Cleburne County Courthouse, and properties within the Heber Springs Commercial Historic District, each listed on the National Register of Historic Places.

Major intersections

Tumbling Shoals spur

Arkansas Highway 25 Spur is a spur route in Tumbling Shoals. It is a former alignment of AR 25 that leads to Greers Ferry Lake and Old Highway 25 Park.

Major intersections

Charlotte spur

Arkansas Highway 25 Spur is a spur route in Charlotte. AR 25S runs south to Cord-Charlotte Schools.

Major intersections

Former route

Arkansas Highway 25 Spur was a  spur route in Heber Springs.

References

025
025
Transportation in Cleburne County, Arkansas
Transportation in Independence County, Arkansas